Municipality of Victor Larco Herrera is a Peruvian governing body that rules in Victor Larco Herrera district. It is located in Buenos Aires in west of Trujillo city. It has legal autonomy granted by the law of municipalities of Peru

Structure

The Council, composed of the mayor and aldermen, is the regulatory and supervisory agency. 
The Mayor is the executive agency.
The coordinating bodies are the Local Coordinating Council (district) and Neighborhood Boards

Companies
SEDALIB provides water and sanitation in La Libertad Region
Caja Trujillo is a local bank

See also

Municipality of Trujillo
Historic Centre of Trujillo
Chan Chan
Huanchaco
Puerto Chicama
Chimu
Pacasmayo beach
Plaza de Armas of Trujillo
Moche
Víctor Larco Herrera District
Vista Alegre
Buenos Aires
Las Delicias beach
Independence of Trujillo
Wall of Trujillo
Santiago de Huamán
Lake Conache
Marinera Festival
Trujillo Spring Festival
Wetlands of Huanchaco
Salaverry beach
Puerto Morín
Virú culture
Marcahuamachuco
Wiracochapampa

External links

Map of Trujillo (Wikimapia)
"Huaca de la luna and Huaca del sol"
"Huacas del Sol y de la Luna Archaeological Complex", Official Website
Information on El Brujo Archaeological Complex
Chan Chan World Heritage Site, UNESCO
Chan Chan conservation project
Website about Trujillo, Reviews, Events, Business Directory
Municipality of Trujillo

References

Trujillo, Peru